T-cell leukemia homeobox protein 3 is a protein that in humans is encoded by the TLX3 gene.

RNX (HOX11L2, TLX3) belongs to a family of orphan homeobox genes that encode DNA-binding nuclear transcription factors. Members of the HOX11 gene family are characterized by a threonine-47 replacing cytosine in the highly conserved homeodomain (Dear et al., 1993).[supplied by OMIM]

References

Further reading